The biosphere reserves of Iran have a total land area of 1.64 million km2. They support more than 8,000 recorded species of plants (almost 2,421 are endemic), 502 species of birds, 164 species of mammals, 209 species of reptiles, and 375 species of butterflies.

Iran has taken many steps to protect its natural resources, biodiversity, and landscapes. The country has established national parkss, natural monuments, wildlife sanctuaries, and protected areas. The country has also identified and registered 13 areas as biosphere reserves since 1976.

List
 Arasbaran, 1976
 Arjan Protected Area and Lake Parishan, 1976
 Geno, 1976
 Golestan, 1976
 Hara, 1976
 Kavir, 1977
 Lake Oromeeh, 1976
 Miankaleh, 1976
 Touran, 1976
 Dena, 2010
 Tang-e-Sayad & Sabzkuh, 2015
 Hamoun, 2016
 Kopet Dag, 2018

See also
 Geography of Iran
 Iranian Plateau
 List of national parks and protected areas of Iran

References

External links
 Ecological Sciences for Sustainable Development
 Biosphere reserves in Iran
 UNESCO Biosphere Reserves

 Biosphere reserves of Iran
 Ramsar sites in Iran